Berengar Fredol the Younger (died 1323), nephew of Berengar Fredol the Elder, was Bishop of Béziers in 1309, Cardinal-Priest of SS. Nereo e Achilleo in 1312 and Cardinal-Bishop of Porto in 1317. He succeeded his uncle in the post of the dean of the Sacred College in June 1323 and died in Avignon in November of that same year.

External links

14th-century French cardinals
Cardinal-bishops of Porto
1323 deaths
Bishops of Béziers
Deans of the College of Cardinals
Avignon Papacy
Cardinal-nephews
Year of birth unknown